Showgirl is a live album by Australian singer-songwriter Kylie Minogue. It was released along with her first digital single, "Over the Rainbow". The album includes eight of Minogue's biggest hits, live from London in 2005.

Track listing

References
7 Digital

Kylie Minogue live albums
2004 live albums
Parlophone live albums